Tepeüstü is a town in the Küçükçekmece district of Istanbul, Turkey.

Neighbourhoods of Istanbul
Küçükçekmece